Alex Nicki Rasmussen (born 9 June 1984) is a Danish former professional racing cyclist, who rode professionally between 2009 and 2016 for the , , , ,  and  teams. Primarily specialising in track cycling, Rasmussen was also proficient in road racing, winning the Danish National Road Race Championships in 2007.

Career
He was the 2005 Scratch World Champion. Together with Michael Mørkøv, Rasmussen won the Danish Madison Championships six times in a row, and as such, are nicknamed the 'Par nummer syv' (Pair number seven).

Rasmussen was also removed from the Danish UCI Championships team, and faced criminal prosecution. However, on 17 November, Rasmussen was cleared of the charges due to a procedural error on the part of the UCI. The UCI appealed this decision to the Court of Arbitration for Sport in December 2011, with the original decision being overturned on 4 July 2012. As a result, Rasmussen was given a backdated 18-month ban, meaning that he would be suspended until April 2013. His contract with the renamed  squad was also terminated.

On 19 March 2013,  re-signed Rasmussen for the remainder of the 2013 season. Rasmussen left  following the 2013 season, and subsequently announced plans to re-enter track cycling. Rasmussen joined  for the 2014 season.

Major results

Track

2001
 National Championships
1st  Kilo
1st  Team pursuit
 National Junior Championships
1st  Kilo
1st  Sprint
1st  Team pursuit
2002
 National Championships
1st  Kilo
 National Junior Championships
1st  Kilo
1st  Points race
1st  Sprint
1st  Team pursuit
 3rd  Scratch, UCI Junior World Championships
2003
 National Championships
1st  Kilo
1st  Team pursuit
 1st  Individual pursuit, National Under-23 Championships
 3rd  Scratch, UEC European Under-23 Championships
2004
 UEC European Under-23 Championships
1st  Scratch
2nd  Madison
 National Championships
1st  Individual pursuit
1st  Kilo
1st  Madison (with Michael Berling)
1st  Team pursuit
 1st  Individual pursuit, National Under-23 Championships
2005
 1st  Scratch race, UCI World Championships
 UEC European Under-23 Championships
1st  Madison (with Michael Mørkøv)
1st  Scratch
 National Championships
1st  Individual pursuit
1st  Kilo
1st  Madison (with Michael Berling)
1st  Points race
1st  Team pursuit
 1st  Individual pursuit, National Under-23 Championships
2006
 National Championships
1st  Individual pursuit
1st  Kilo
1st  Madison (with Michael Mørkøv)
1st  Team pursuit
2007
 National Championships
1st  Individual pursuit
1st  Madison (with Michael Mørkøv)
1st  Points race
1st  Team pursuit
 1st Six Days of Grenoble (with Michael Mørkøv)
 2nd Six Days of Copenhagen (with Michael Mørkøv)
 3rd  Team pursuit, UCI World Championships
2008
 National Championships
1st  Individual pursuit
1st  Madison (with Michael Mørkøv)
 1st Six Days of Grenoble (with Michael Mørkøv)
 2nd  Team pursuit, Summer Olympics
 UCI World Championships
2nd  Team pursuit
3rd  Madison
 2nd Six Days of Copenhagen (with Michael Mørkøv)
2009
 UCI World Championships
1st  Team pursuit
1st  Madison (with Michael Mørkøv)
 1st  Madison (with Michael Mørkøv), National Championships
 1st Six Days of Ghent (with Michael Mørkøv)
 1st Six Days of Copenhagen (with Michael Mørkøv)
2010
 1st  Scratch race, UCI World Championships
 1st  Madison (with Michael Mørkøv), National Championships
 1st Six Days of Copenhagen (with Michael Mørkøv)
 3rd Six Days of Ghent (with Michael Mørkøv)
 3rd Six Days of Rotterdam (with Michael Mørkøv)
2011
 1st Six Days of Copenhagen (with Michael Mørkøv)
2012
 2nd Six Days of Copenhagen (with Michael Mørkøv)
2014
 2nd  Team pursuit, UCI World Championships
 2nd Six Days of Copenhagen (with Michael Mørkøv)
 3rd Six Days of Rotterdam (with Michael Mørkøv)
2015
 1st Six Days of Copenhagen (with Michael Mørkøv)
 2nd Six Days of Rotterdam (with Michael Mørkøv)
2016
 1st Six Days of Copenhagen (with Jesper Mørkøv)

Road

2004
 6th Time trial, National Under-23 Road Championships
2006
 National Under-23 Road Championships
1st  Time trial
3rd Road race
 1st Overall Tour de Berlin
1st Stages 2 & 3 (ITT)
 3rd GP Herning
 9th Time trial, UEC European Under-23 Road Championships
2007
 1st  Road race, National Road Championships
 2nd Colliers Classic
 5th Overall Tour de Bretagne
 6th Overall Boucles de la Mayenne
1st  Points classification
2008
 Tour of Qinghai Lake
1st  Points classification
1st Prologue, Stages 1, 3 & 9
 1st Stage 3 Ronde de l'Oise
 3rd Rogaland GP
 4th Duo Normand (with Jens-Erik Madsen)
2009
 2nd Time trial, National Road Championships
 4th Giro del Capo Challenge 4
 4th Profronde van Fryslan
2010
 1st GP Herning
 Four Days of Dunkirk
1st Stages 1 & 3
 1st Stage 4 (ITT) Vuelta a Andalucía
 2nd Time trial, National Road Championships
 10th Designa Grand Prix
2011
 1st Philadelphia International Championship
 1st Stage 1 (TTT) Giro d'Italia
 4th Time trial, National Road Championships
2012
 1st Stage 4 (TTT) Giro d'Italia
 2nd Grand Prix de Denain
2013
 1st Stage 1 Bayern–Rundfahrt
 National Road Championships
4th Time trial
7th Road race
2014
 Dookoła Mazowsza
1st Stages 3 & 4
 2nd Skive–Løbet
 7th Time trial, National Road Championships

Grand Tour general classification results timeline

References

External links

Cycling Base: Alex Rasmussen 
Cycling Quotient: Alex Rasmussen

Cyclists at the 2008 Summer Olympics
Danish male cyclists
Doping cases in cycling
Danish sportspeople in doping cases
Olympic cyclists of Denmark
Olympic silver medalists for Denmark
UCI Track Cycling World Champions (men)
1984 births
Living people
Olympic medalists in cycling
Medalists at the 2008 Summer Olympics
Sportspeople from Odense
Danish track cyclists